Guillem Ballaz i Bogunyà (born 17 August 1978) is a Catalan musician who has focused his work on Catalan traditional music. First through groups like Sol i Serena, and later under his name in a more personal project. He has also made an important task studying and revitalizing the Catalan square tambourine "pandero quadrat" and their tunes and Catalan folk violin.

Biography
Guillem Ballaz was born in Molins de Rei, town 10 km from Barcelona. Son of Jesus Ballaz Zabalza, Navarre, and Maria Angels Bogunyà Carulla, Catalan. His musical training began at an early age with the violin. Later he studied industrial engineering in electronics but even before graduating opt for the professional music. Their music, always seek the border between tradition and modernity, performing around Europe (France, UK, Italy, Belgium, Spain, Portugal ...) Also he teach in Aula de Musica Tradicional de Salt and Music School of Besalu.

Ballaz investigates Catalan square tambourine "pandero quadrat" and their tunes for ten years. During this time publishes articles in specialized journals, conducts workshops, seminars ... to explain the importance of this tradition in Catalan society over the past five centuries. Thanks to this, today's square tambourine Catalan and his tunes are back alive.
Ballaz sings with his square tambourine from modes scenarios to major cultural centers like the Palau de la Música Catalana
This work culminated with the presentation of monographic work "Projecte Pandero" in December 2012

Discography
 Disc de Butxaca (2003)
 Grapat de ruda (2007)
 Un segon (2009)
 Projecte Pandero (2012)

Also appears on
 19è Festival Internacional de Folk Tradicionarius (2006)
 20è Festival Internacional de Folk Tradicionarius (2007)
 Altaveu Frontera – 19è Festival de música Altaveu (2007)
 Llotja de música urbana de Vilareal (2007)
 10a Mediterrània- Fira d'espectacles d'arrel tradicional de Manresa (2007)
 World music from Catalonia (2009)
 Catalan Arts (2013)

References

  Diari Ara (newspaper), February 2013.
 in the EBU -UER Folk Catalan representation in EBU – UER Folk (European Broadcasting Union), 2012
 , [Celtic Connections] launch, BBC, November 2011.
  , Recopilation music 2009.

Anti-racism activists
Musicians from Catalonia
Singer-songwriters from Catalonia
People from Molins de Rei
1978 births
Living people
21st-century Spanish singers